The Interparliamentary Assembly on Orthodoxy, or I.A.O., is a transnational, inter-parliamentary institution that in 1994 was originally established as the European Interparliamentary Assembly on Orthodoxy (EIAO).

Based in Athens, Greece, the Interparliamentary Assembly on Orthodoxy constitutes a permanent communication structure between parliamentarians of member states aiming at unity in diversity of Orthodox Christians on the principles and values of Christianity and democracy.

History

Inspired by a conference held from 30 June to 4 July 1993 in Chalkidiki on the topic of "Orthodoxy in the New European Reality", the European Interparliamentary Assembly on Orthodoxy was formed by the initiative of the Hellenic Parliament. Following the 1993 Manifesto of the Participants, the official Founding Act was passed by the participants of the Founding Synod held in November 1994 in Athens. In 2001, groups of parliamentarians from Australia, Asia, Africa and the United States participated in the General Assembly, the organization was then renamed Interparliamentary Assembly on Orthodoxy (I.A.O.).

During the June 2004 General Assembly in Kyiv, Ukraine, it was decided to seek cooperation with the Parliamentary Union of the Organisation of Islamic Cooperation (P.U.I.C.). A co-operation agreement was drafted at a meeting of the two organizations on 22 March 2005, in Athens. On 19 May 2010, a cooperation agreement with the Pan-African Parliament was signed by PUIC's President Idriss Ndele Moussa and I.A.O.'s Secretary-General Anastasios Nerantzis

Massive protests broke out during the 2019 General Assembly in Tbilisi, Georgia, after the chairman of the assembly, a Russian communist named Sergei Gavrilov, made a number of public statements that were viewed by the Georgian public as denigrating Georgian sovereignty.

Institutional bodies

General Assembly
The supreme organ of the I.A.O. is the General Assembly, consisting of delegations from all member parliaments. The General Assembly convenes once annually during the month of June.

General Assembly timeline

Presidents of the General Assembly
The President of the General Assembly is elected for a two-year tenure by the plenary session of the Assembly.
 2020–present: Sergei Gavrilov

International Secretariat
The International Secretariat appoints eight standing committees. It is headed by the Secretary-General, the Alternate Secretary and the Treasurer, and consists of an additional six members from various countries. As of 2020, the leadership consists of:

 Secretary-General: Maximos Charakopoulos 
 Alternate Secretary: Andreas Michailidis 
 Treasurer: Stavros Kalafatis 

International Secretariat representatives:
 Alexandr Cotric 
 Theodore Ssekikubo 
 Eugeniusz Czykwin 
 Dmitry Sablin 
 Angelos Votsis 
 Hany Naguib

Committees of the International Secretariat
As of 2020, the following committees are led by:
 Committee on Human Rights: Vangjel Dule 
 Committee on Mass Media: Milen Mihov 
 Committee on Social Activity, Family and Motherhood:Elie Ferzli 
 Committee on Education: Alen Simonyan 
 Cooperation Committee with the Pan-African Parliament: Athanasios Davakis 
 Cooperation Committee with the Parliamentary Assembly of the Russian – Belarus Union: Gennadiy Davydko  
 Cooperation Committee with the Parliamentary Union of the Organisation of Islamic Cooperation member-states: Joseph Iskander 
 Cooperation Working Group with the International Catholic Legislators Network:  Lefteris Christoforou

Member countries
The Assembly currently consists of parliamentary committees of 21 countries, mostly from Eastern Europe, including:

 
 
 
 
 
 
 
 
 
 
 
 
 
 
 
 
 
 
 
 
 

Additionally, delegations from Africa, Asia, Australia, the European Union, and the United States have been participating in the Assembly.

Cooperation agreements
The I.A.O. has signed several cooperation agreements with various international organizations, including:
 Parliamentary Union of the Organisation of Islamic Cooperation, since March 2005
 Parliamentary Assembly of the Union State, since November 2011
 Pan-African Parliament, since May 2011
 Interparliamentary Assembly of the Eurasian Economic Union, since November 2011
 Parliamentary Assembly of the Black Sea Economic Cooperation (PABSEC), observer status mutually granted
 Inter-Parliamentary Union, observer status mutually granted
 Parliamentary Assembly of the Mediterranean, Memorandum of Understanding since February 2019

The I.A.O has also participated in United Nations General Assembly conferences, has signed cooperation treaties with the parliaments of Egypt, Iran and Lebanon, as well as explored future cooperation with the Baltic Assembly, the European Parliament and the International Catholic Legislators Network: ICLN.

See also

 Christianity in Europe
 Politics of Europe
 Religion in Europe

References

External links
  
 Interparliamentary Assembly on Orthodoxy on Facebook

 
Eastern Orthodox organizations established in the 20th century
Organizations established in 1994
Organizations based in Athens
1994 establishments in Greece
Greece–Russia relations
Eastern Orthodox ecumenical and interfaith relations
Christian ecumenical organizations